Shabankareh (also Romanized as Shabānkāreh; formerly, Old Village  (ده كهنه), also Romanized as Deh-e Kohneh) is a city in Shabankareh District of Dashtestan County, Bushehr province, Iran. At the 2006 census, its population was 6,975 in 1,459 households. The following census in 2011 counted 7,653 people in 1,940 households. The latest census in 2016 showed a population of 7,900 people in 2,253 households.

References 

Cities in Bushehr Province
Populated places in Dashtestan County

az:Şəbankarə